The Oskaloosa City Hall is a historic government building located in Oskaloosa, Iowa, United States.  It was designed by Des Moines architect Frank E. Wetherell, an Oskaloosa native, in the Renaissance Revival style. It was originally designed along with the adjoining fire station in 1905.  The buildings were designed for phased construction, and the city council decided to build the fire station first. It was individually listed on the National Register of Historic Places in 1991.  Previously it had been included as a contributing property in the Oskaloosa City Square Commercial Historic District.

References

Government buildings completed in 1911
Oskaloosa, Iowa
Renaissance Revival architecture in Iowa
Buildings and structures in Mahaska County, Iowa
National Register of Historic Places in Mahaska County, Iowa
City and town halls on the National Register of Historic Places in Iowa
1911 establishments in Iowa
Individually listed contributing properties to historic districts on the National Register in Iowa